Esvagt is Danish offshore shipping company providing safety and support at sea.

History
Esvagt was founded in 1981. It supports the offshore wind and oil and gas industries with a wide range of specialised services: standby, emergency response and rescue vessels (ERRV), oil spill response, firefighting, tanker assistance, rig moves, supply services and inter-field transfer of cargo and personnel. 

3i Infrastructure and AMP Capital acquired Esvagt from the Maersk Group and ESE Holding in 2015. It is now wholly owned by 3i Infrastructure.

Vessels
Esvagt owns and operates a fleet of more than 40 vessels, including nine Service Operation Vessels (SOV). They developed SOVs in 2010 to provide accommodation and working spaces in support of the offshore wind industry.

Service Operation Vessels (SOV)

Multi-role ERRV

Standby ERRV
mostly 45.80 m length

Crew Change Vessel
Esvagt Beta 1991 / 2008 76.60 m

References

Shipping companies of Denmark
Danish companies established in 1981
Companies based in Esbjerg Municipality